Chakravarthy is a 1991 Indian Malayalam film, directed by A. Sreekumar and produced by Pappachan. The film stars Suresh Gopi, Kasthuri, Captain Raju, Rajan P. Dev, Babu Antony, Jagathy Sreekumar and Manoj K. Jayan in the lead roles. The film has musical score by P. C. Susi.

Cast

Suresh Gopi as Unni Shankar / Chakravarthy
Kasthuri
Captain Raju
Rajan P. Dev as Patric Perrerra
Babu Antony as Edwin
Jagathy Sreekumar
Manoj K. Jayan as Thampi
Sukumaran
Jagannatha Varma
KPAC Sunny
Sukumari as Unni Shankar's mother
Santhi Moorthy

Soundtrack
The music was composed by P. C. Susi and the lyrics were written by Bichu Thirumala.

References

External links
 

1991 films
1990s Malayalam-language films